Lawson is an unincorporated community and census-designated place (CDP) in Union County, Arkansas, United States. Lawson was founded by Lawson Smith, who was born in 1813 and died in 1899. Lawson has a post office with ZIP code 71750. It was first listed as a CDP in the 2020 census with a population of 260.

Education
It is in the El Dorado School District. The district operates El Dorado High School.

In 1978 the Lawson and Urbana school districts merged into the El Dorado district.

Demographics

2020 census

Note: the US Census treats Hispanic/Latino as an ethnic category. This table excludes Latinos from the racial categories and assigns them to a separate category. Hispanics/Latinos can be of any race.

References

Unincorporated communities in Union County, Arkansas
Unincorporated communities in Arkansas
census-designated places in Union County, Arkansas
census-designated places in Arkansas